Valluvanadu may refer to:

 Kingdom of Valluvanad, North-Central Kerala
 Valluvanadu (erstwhile) in Kanyakumari district, Tamil Nadu
 Valluvanadu region, Kerala
 Valluvanadu, a proposed new district within the state of Kerala
 Kingdom of Valluvadi in Wayanad district, Karnataka-Kerala